After Alice (also known as Eye of The Killer) is a 2000 mystery thriller directed by Paul Marcus and written by Jeff Miller. The film stars Kiefer Sutherland as Detective Mickey Hayden.

Plot 
A troubled cop makes a discovery that really has him worried in this thriller. Police detective Mickey Hayden (Kiefer Sutherland) is ordered to take a new look at a case he'd worked on ten years ago. A brilliant but demented serial killer known as Jabberwocky went on a killing spree before dropping out of sight. Hayden was never able to track him down and the disappointment has left him with more than his share of emotional scars, resulting in alcoholism. After a decade of silence, Jabberwocky strikes again, sending the police a note suggesting Hayden be put back on his case. But this time around, Hayden notices something different as he investigates the killings; when he comes in contact with the evidence, he has troubling psychic visions that tell him more about the murders than he ever wanted to know.

Cast

References

External links
 

2000 films
Canadian mystery thriller films
English-language Canadian films
Films directed by Paul Marcus
2000s mystery thriller films
Trimark Pictures films
Films scored by Michael Hoenig
2000s English-language films
2000s Canadian films